The New Zealand Superstock Championship is an annually contested national championship for superstocks on a rotating track schedule. The current champion is Asher Rees, registered to Kihikihi Speedway, who won his first title at Paradise Valley Raceway, near Rotorua, in January 2021.

Graham Stretch was the inaugural champion, winning the title at Palmerston North International Speedway(Central Energy Trust Arena) in the 1965/66 season. Craig Boote and Kevin Free have been the most successful winners, each winning 3 times.

Racing rules
Dirt track racing in New Zealand comes in many different forms such as sprintcars, sidecars, late model and many others, but the most popular is Superstocks racing. Superstocks racing allows for full contact, hardcore racing around oval dirt tracks with concrete walls in close proximity to the outside of the track. Drivers are entitled to push one another into the infield, up the wall or into one another in the fight for victory. With no blue flags backmarker cars may wait for the lead pack and if drivers wish, may take out lead cars to best suit their track code, friends, family or teammates from the New Zealand Superstock Teams Championship.

Engines
Current Speedway New Zealand rules stipulate the engine must be no larger the 248 cubic inches, with most teams using V6 or V8 race engines. The estimated power output figure is around 500hp. 
Most cars tend to run:
 Toyota VVTI V8
 Nissan VK56 V8
 Nissan VH41 V8
 Ford V8
 Chevrolet V8

Past champions

Records

References

Superstock racing
Superstock